The West Riding of Yorkshire is one of three historic subdivisions of Yorkshire, England. From 1889 to 1974 the administrative county County of York, West Riding (the area under the control of West Riding County Council), abbreviated County of York (WR), was based closely on the historic boundaries. The lieutenancy at that time included the City of York and as such was named West Riding of the County of York and the County of the City of York.

Its boundaries roughly correspond to the present ceremonial counties of West Yorkshire, South Yorkshire and the Craven, Harrogate and Selby districts of North Yorkshire, along with smaller parts in Lancashire (for example, the parishes of Barnoldswick, Bracewell, Brogden and Salterforth became part of the Pendle district of Lancashire and the parishes of Great Mitton, Newsholme and Bowland Forest Low became part of the Ribble Valley district also in Lancashire), Cumbria, Greater Manchester and, since 1996, the unitary East Riding of Yorkshire.

Geography 
The West Riding encompasses 1,771,562 acres (7,169 km2) from Sheffield in the south to Sedbergh in the north and from Dunsop Bridge in the west to Adlingfleet in the east.

The southern industrial district, considered in the broadest application of the term, extended northward from Sheffield to Skipton and eastward from Sheffield to Doncaster, covering less than one-half of the riding.  Within this district were Barnsley, Batley, Bradford, Brighouse, Dewsbury, Doncaster, Halifax, Huddersfield, Keighley, Leeds, Morley, Ossett, Pontefract, Pudsey, Rotherham, Sheffield, Todmorden (partly in Lancashire until 1888, when fully incorporated into Yorkshire) and Wakefield. Major centres elsewhere in the riding included Harrogate and Ripon.

Within the industrial region, other urban districts included Bingley, Bolton on Dearne, Castleford, Cleckheaton, Elland, Featherstone, Handsworth, Hoyland Nether, Liversedge, Mexborough, Mirfield, Normanton, Rawmarsh, Rothwell, Saddleworth, Shipley, Skipton, Sowerby Bridge, Stanley, Swinton, Thornhill, Wath-upon-Dearne, Wombwell and Worsborough. Outside the industrial region were Goole, Ilkley, Knaresborough and Selby. The West Riding also contained a large rural area to the north including part of the Yorkshire Dales National Park (the remainder of the park being in the North Riding).

History 
The subdivision of Yorkshire into three ridings or "thirds" is of Scandinavian origin.  The West Riding was first recorded (in the form West Treding) in the Domesday Book of 1086.

Unlike most English counties, Yorkshire, being so large, was divided first into the three ridings (East, North and West) and, later, the city of York (which lay within the city walls and was not part of any riding). Each riding was then divided into wapentakes, a division comparable to the hundreds of Southern England and the wards of England's four northernmost historic counties.

Wapentakes 

Within the West Riding of Yorkshire there were ten wapentakes in total, four of which were split into two divisions; those were: Claro (Upper and Lower), Skyrack (Upper and Lower), Strafforth and Tickhill (Upper and Lower) and Staincliffe (East and West). The wapentake of Agbrigg and Morley was created with two divisions but was later split into two wapentakes. A wapentake known as the Ainsty to the west of York was until the 15th century a wapentake of the West Riding, but since then has come under the administration of the City of York.

Administrative county 
The administrative county was formed in 1889 by the Local Government Act 1888, and covered the historic West Riding except for the larger urban areas, which were county boroughs with the powers of both a municipal borough and a county council. Initially there were five in number: Bradford, Leeds, Huddersfield, Halifax, and Sheffield. The City of York (also a county borough) was included in the county for census and lieutenancy purposes. The number of county boroughs increased over the years; Rotherham gained this status in 1902, Barnsley and Dewsbury in 1913, Wakefield in 1915 and Doncaster in 1927. The boundaries of existing county boroughs were also widened.

Beginning in 1898, the West Riding County Council was based at the County Hall in Wakefield, which was inherited by the West Yorkshire Metropolitan County Council in 1974.

The Local Government Act 1888 included the entirety of Todmorden with the West Riding administrative county, and also in its lieutenancy area ("county"). Other boundary changes in the county included the expansion of the county borough of Sheffield southward in areas historically in Derbyshire such as Dore.

Fingerposts erected in the West Riding until the mid-1960s had a distinctive style. At the top of the post was a roundel in the form of a hollow circle with a horizontal line across the middle, displaying "Yorks W.R.", the name of the fingerpost's location, and a grid reference. Other counties, apart from Dorset, did not display a grid reference and did not have a horizontal bar through the roundel. From 1964, many fingerposts were replaced by ones in the modern style, but some of the old style still survive within the West Riding boundaries.

By 1971 1,924,853 people (or 50.85% of the West Riding's population) lived in the administrative county, against 1,860,435 (or 49.15%) in the ten county boroughs.

Current usage

The term West Riding is still used in the names of the following clubs, and organisations:
 Foot, First Yorkshire West Riding Regiment, 33rd a re-enactment group based in Halifax who depict this Regiment during the Napoleonic Wars
 49 (West Riding) Signal Squadron (Volunteers), a squadron of 34 (Northern) Signal Regiment (Volunteers) based at Carlton Barracks in Leeds
 51st (2nd Yorkshire, West Riding) Light Infantry, a re-enactment group based in the West Midlands who depict this Regiment during the Napoleonic Wars
 106 (West Riding) Field Squadron, a squadron of 72 Engineer Regiment (Volunteers) based in Greenhill, Sheffield and Manningham Lane, Bradford
 269 (West Riding) Battery Royal Artillery, a Surveillance and Target Acquisition battery of 101 (Northumbrian) Regiment Royal Artillery (Volunteers) based at Carlton Barracks in Leeds
 609 (West Riding) Squadron RAuxAF, a Royal Auxiliary Air Force squadron based at RAF Leeming
 Duke of Wellington's Regiment (West Riding) Regimental Museum
 West Riding Cat Rescue
 Leeds – West Riding Cricket League
 Provincial Grand Lodge of Yorkshire, West Riding, a province in Freemasonry
 West Riding County Football Association, the governing body for football in the former riding, exclusive of the area covered by the Sheffield and Hallamshire Football Association, which antedated the formation of County FAs.
 West Riding Girls Football League 
 West Riding Opera
 West Riding Organics, manufacturers of Soil Association certified peat free organic composts and fertilisers
 West Riding Ramblers Association
 West Riding Sailing Club

See also
List of Lord Lieutenants of the West Riding
Custos Rotulorum of the West Riding of Yorkshire – List of Keepers of the Rolls

References

External links

Map of the West Riding of Yorkshire on Wikishire
Information on the West Riding of Yorkshire on I'm From Yorkshire

 
History of local government in Yorkshire
History of Yorkshire
Yorkshire, West Riding